"Loving Up a Storm" is the title of the following works:

Songs 
 "Lovin' Up a Storm" (Jerry Lee Lewis song), 1959
 "Loving Up a Storm" (Razzy Bailey song), 1980